Nigella hispanica, the Spanish fennel flower, is a species of flowering plant in the family Ranunculaceae, native to Portugal, Spain, and France. An annual or biennial reaching , the Royal Horticultural Society considers it a good plant to attract pollinators.

References

hispanica
Garden plants of Europe
Flora of Portugal
Flora of Spain
Flora of France
Taxa named by Carl Linnaeus
Plants described in 1753